The 2014 Iowa Corn Indy 300 was the 12th round of the 2014 IndyCar Series season. Scott Dixon scored his first pole of the season.

Report

Background
The previous race at Pocono was won by Juan Pablo Montoya who won his first race since his comeback. Montoya had scored his last IndyCar win in 2000 at Gateway.

References

Iowa Corn Indy 300
Iowa Corn Indy 300
Iowa Corn
Iowa Corn